A morir (Spanish "till death") may refer to:

A morir (Américo album), album by Chilean singer Américo 2008
A morir (es), album by Spanish heavy metal band Saratoga (band) 2003
A Morir (es), album by Argentine band Catupecu Machu 1998